Turn Park Art Space, is an open-air museum, sculpture park, and performance space located in West Stockbridge, Massachusetts.  The approximately  site is located on the grounds of a former lime and marble quarry. 
 It includes a collection of sculptures, mostly from the Soviet Nonconformist Art movement of the 1950s - 1980s, represented by Nikolai Silis, Vladimir Lemport and Nazar Bilyk. The Gate House contains a temporary exhibition space. A 2000-square foot art gallery is planned for the site. A small amphitheater is used for outdoor performances.

The park was established in May 2017 by collectors Igor Gomberg and Katya Brezgunova, and designed by architects Grigori Fateyev and Alexander Konstantinov

References

External links 

 

Sculpture gardens, trails and parks in the United States
Outdoor sculptures in Massachusetts
Open-air museums in Massachusetts
Art museums and galleries in Massachusetts
Museums in Berkshire County, Massachusetts
Art museums established in 2017
Parks in Berkshire County, Massachusetts
2017 establishments in Massachusetts
West Stockbridge, Massachusetts